Westbrook High School or Westbrook School is a 1A public high school located in Westbrook, Texas (USA). It is part of the Westbrook Independent School District located in western Mitchell County. In 2011, the school was rated "Academically Acceptable" by the Texas Education Agency.

Athletics
The Westbrook Wildcats compete in the following sports:

Basketball
Cross Country
6-Man Football
Golf
Tennis
Track and Field

State Titles
Football
2021(6M/D1), 2022(6M/D1)

References

External links
Westbrook ISD
List of Six-man football stadiums in Texas

Schools in Mitchell County, Texas
Public high schools in Texas
Public middle schools in Texas
Public elementary schools in Texas